Indian School Fujairah is an educational institute based in Fujairah, UAE. It was established in 1980.

It follows Kerala syllabus.

References 

1980 establishments in the United Arab Emirates
Educational institutions established in 1980
Schools in the Emirate of Fujairah